KCKN (1020 kHz) is an AM radio station broadcasting a Spanish Religious radio format in Roswell, New Mexico.  It is owned by Radio Vision Cristiana Subsidiary Corp.  Much of the programming is also heard on co-owned WWRV 1330 AM in New York City.

KCKN is powered at 50,000 watts, the maximum for AM stations licensed by the Federal Communications Commission (FCC).  It is a Class B outlet, required to protect Class A clear channel station KDKA Pittsburgh.  So KCKN uses a directional antenna at all times, with a three-tower array by day and a six-tower array at night.  KCKN's transmitter is on La Luz Road at Old Clovis Highway in Roswell.

History 

The station signed on the air for the first time in December 1965 under the call sign KSWS.  It was co-owned with KSWS-TV (now KOBR-TV). In 1987, the station changed its call letters to KCKN. On November 13, 2000, the station changed its call sign to KXEM and on December 1 of that year to KINF. As KINF, the station aired a news/talk format. The station reverted to the current KCKN calls on January 12, 2006.
 A sister FM station was purchased in 1986.

In the Kansas City market the station was using the call sign KBCQ at the time programming Top 40 and the FM station had the KCKN call sign and a country music format.  In April 1987, the call signs and formats of the two stations were flipped and 1020 became KCKN Country and the FM became KBCQ-FM Top 40.  In the early 90s, KCKN switched to a soft adult contemporary format with a large news commitment.  Night time programming has been religion for years.

In late August 2005, while operating under a local marketing agreement (LMA), the station was off the air due to technical problems.  The LMA was ended and the station signed back on the air in early February, 2006, under the call sign KCKN programming Classic Country music. In 2012, the station was sold to Radio Vision Cristiana Subsidiary Corp.  KCKN switched to Spanish language Christian radio.

On June 11, 2018 the transmitter for KCKN caught fire and badly damaged the transmitter building. KCKN requested a special temporary authority (STA) to operate an auxiliary transmitter. The FCC approved the request; however, the fire department forbade using it until electrical inspections took place. KCKN remained silent until inspections took place.

References

External links 

 FCC History Cards for KCKN

Christianity in New Mexico
CKN
CKN
Radio stations established in 1965
1965 establishments in New Mexico